CD151 molecule (Raph blood group), also known as CD151  (Cluster of Differentiation 151), is a human gene.

Function 

The protein encoded by this gene is a member of the transmembrane 4 superfamily, also known as the tetraspanin family. Most of these members are cell-surface proteins that are characterized by the presence of four hydrophobic domains. The proteins mediate signal transduction events that play a role in the regulation of cell development, activation, growth and motility. This encoded protein is a cell surface glycoprotein that is known to complex with integrins and other transmembrane 4 superfamily proteins. It is involved in cellular processes including cell adhesion and may regulate integrin trafficking and/or function. This protein enhances cell motility, invasion and metastasis of cancer cells. Multiple alternatively spliced transcript variants that encode the same protein have been described for this gene. Abnormalities in CD151 have been implicated in a form of epidermolysis bullosa.

Interactions 

CD151 has been shown to interact with CD46.

See also 
 Cluster of differentiation
 Tetraspanin

References

Further reading

External links 
 Raph blood group system in the BGMUT blood group antigen gene mutation database
 

Clusters of differentiation

Blood antigen systems
Transfusion medicine